Lyubomir Georgiev Todorov (born 4 October 1988) is a Bulgarian footballer who plays as a forward.

Career
In July 2018, Todorov returned to Spartak Pleven.

References

External links
 
 

1988 births
Living people
People from Pleven Province
Bulgarian footballers
First Professional Football League (Bulgaria) players
Second Professional Football League (Bulgaria) players
PFC Spartak Pleven players
PFC Lokomotiv Mezdra players
PFC Minyor Pernik players

Association football forwards